Ralph Lawrence Hansch (May 20, 1924 – February 29, 2008) was a Canadian ice hockey goaltender.

Early life 
He was born in Edmonton, Alberta. In 1950 and 1951, he played with the Edmonton Flyers.

Career 
Hansch was a member of the Edmonton Mercurys that won a gold medal at the 1952 Winter Olympics in Oslo, Norway. He is the only goaltender to wear number "0" at the Olympics. From 1949 to 1984, Hansch served as a firefighter in the Edmonton Fire Department.

Personal life 
Hansch and his wife, Bonnie, had three children. His son, Randy Hansch, played in the Western Hockey League and was general manager of the Edmonton Oil Kings.

References

1924 births
2008 deaths
Canadian ice hockey goaltenders
Ice hockey players at the 1952 Winter Olympics
Medalists at the 1952 Winter Olympics
Olympic gold medalists for Canada
Olympic ice hockey players of Canada
Olympic medalists in ice hockey
Ice hockey people from Edmonton